Proof Through the Night is a 1983 album by T Bone Burnett, produced by Jeff Eyrich.  Proof Through the Night was  unavailable on CD for many years. Then some tracks, radically remixed with new vocals if not re-recorded entirely, appeared on the 20/20 career compilation in May 2006.  Rhino Handmade issued a CD version of the album on March 27, 2007, which also includes the Trap Door and Beyond the Trap Door EPs.  The double CD was issued in a numbered limited edition of 5,000.  A cover of the Hank Williams (as Luke the Drifter) song "Be Careful of Stones that You Throw", recorded during an early session for the album, is also included on the CD.

Reception

Music critic Brett Hartenbach of Allmusic called the album "smart, tight, [and] insightful" and wrote "To some, his persistent morality may come across as being a bit cold or even self-righteous, but further investigation reveals an underlying empathy for the individuals, even if a cynicism for the times in which they live is expressed. And if Burnett may seem tough, don't think he excludes himself from the same scrutiny."

Track listing
All songs written by T Bone Burnett, except where noted.

Side one
 "The Murder Weapon" (featuring Masakazu Yoshizawa & Mick Ronson)
 "Fatally Beautiful" (featuring Pete Townshend)
 "After All These Years"
 "Baby Fall Down" (featuring Steven Soles)
 "The Sixties" (featuring Mick Ronson & Pete Townshend)

Side two
 "Stunned" (featuring Andy Williams & Stan Lynch) 
 "Pressure" (featuring Mick Ronson)
 "Hula Hoop" (Written by T-Bone Burnett/John Fleming/Roscoe West)
 "When the Night Falls" (featuring Ry Cooder)
 "Hefner and Disney" (featuring Masakazu Yoshizawa & Pete Townshend)
 "Shut it Tight" (featuring Richard Thompson)

Personnel
 T Bone Burnett – vocals, guitar
 David Mansfield – guitar
 David Miner – bass
 Jerry Marotta – drums
 Ry Cooder on "When the Night Falls" – guitar
 Stan Lynch – drums, percussion, keyboards, vocals
 Mick Ronson – guitar
 Richard Thompson – guitar, mandolin
 Pete Townshend – guitar
 Masakazu Yoshizawa
 The Williams Brothers – vocals
 Jeff Eyrich – producer

Chart positions

References

1983 albums
T Bone Burnett albums
Warner Records albums
Albums produced by Jeff Eyrich